René Samuel Cassin (5 October 1887 – 20 February 1976) was a French jurist known for co-authoring the Universal Declaration of Human Rights and receiving the Nobel Peace Prize.

Born in Bayonne, Cassin served as a soldier in the First World War during which he was seriously wounded. He was of Portuguese-Jewish descent.

On 24 June 1940, during the Second World War, Cassin heeded General Charles de Gaulle's radio appeal and joined him in London. Cassin used his legal expertise to help de Gaulle's Free French.

Between 1944 and 1959, Cassin was a member of the Council of State.

Seconded to the UN Commission on Human Rights after the war, he was a major contributor to the 1948 Universal Declaration of Human Rights. For that work, he received the Nobel Peace Prize in 1968. The same year, he was awarded one of the UN General Assembly's Human Rights Prizes.

Early life 

Cassin was born in Bayonne  on 5 October 1887, to a Sephardi Jewish family. At the University of Aix he studied political economics, constitutional history, and Roman law and was awarded distinctions in law, a university degree with distinction and the first prize in the competitive examinations in the faculty of law. He was an invited speaker at international peace conferences. In 1914 in Paris, he was awarded his doctorate in juridical science, economics and politics.

First World War 

Cassin served in the First World War in 1916 at the Battle of the Meuse. In one operation, he led the attack on enemy positions and was gravely injured in the arm, side and stomach by machine gunfire. A medic saved his life, but he received surgical treatment only ten days later at Antibes. He was awarded the Croix de Guerre for his actions but was too seriously injured to return to active duty, and he was mustered out as a war invalid.

Interwar period
He helped to found the Union fédérale, a leftist pacifist organization for veterans.

Cassin also headed many non-governmental organizations (NGO) and founded the French Federation of Disabled War Veterans in 1918 and served until 1940 as its president and then as its honorary president.

As a French delegate to the League of Nations from 1924 to 1938, Cassin pressed for progress on disarmament and for developing institutions to aid the resolution of international conflicts.

Second World War 

Refusing the armistice, Cassin embarked on a British ship, the SS Ettrick, in Saint-Jean-de-Luz on 24 June 1940, and joined General Charles de Gaulle in London to help him continue the war against Germany. Cassin was, therefore, one of the first to join de Gaulle.
De Gaulle needed legal help to draft the statutes of Free France and so Cassin's arrival in London was very welcome.

René Cassin did not speak English but already knew leading academics and political figures like British Foreign Minister Anthony Eden.

In April 1941, Cassin made a radio broadcast from London by addressing himself especially to French Jews from a secular viewpoint and reminding them of the full and equal protection that France had always offered to Jews since the French Revolution. He exhorted them to help pay back that debt by joining the forces of Free France. In May, Vichy France stripped Cassin of his French citizenship and in 1942 sentenced him to death in absentia.

Later life and career 
After the war, Cassin was assigned to the United Nations to help draft the Universal Declaration of Human Rights. Working from a list of rights elaborated by the Canadian scholar and professor of law John Humphrey, Cassin produced a revised draft and expanded the text.

He served on the UN Human Rights Commission and the Hague Court of Arbitration.

He was also a member (1959–1965) and president (1965–1968) of the European Court of Human Rights. The court building is now on Allée René Cassin, in Strasbourg.

In 1945, General de Gaulle suggested for Cassin, having done so much for the French people, to do something also to help the Jewish people. Cassin became the president of the French-Jewish Alliance Israelite Universelle (AIU) which had been dedicated primarily to educating Sephardi Jews living in the Ottoman Empire according to a modern French curriculum. As president of the AIU, Cassin worked with the American Jewish Committee and the Anglo-Jewish Association to found the Consultative Council of Jewish Organisations, a network dedicated to building support for Cassin's platform of human rights from a Jewish perspective while the UN human rights system was in its early stages of development.

In 1947, Cassin created the French Institute of Administrative Sciences (IFSA). He was the first president of the association, which organized many conferences to help to develop the French doctrine in administrative law.

On 10 November 1950, he was photographed at a UN radio, alongside Karim Azkoul, Georges Day and Herald CL Roy, participating in a roundtable discussion for the use of French-speaking countries. That is perhaps all the more interesting because Azkoul and Cassin differed so strongly in their perspectives concerning the politics of Zionism.

Cassin died in Paris in 1976 and was initially interred at the Montparnasse Cemetery in Paris. In 1987, his remains were exhumed and enshrined in the crypt of the Pantheon in Paris.

Legacy 
In 2001, the CCJO René Cassin was founded in Cassin's memory to promote universal human rights from a Jewish perspective.

The René Cassin Medal is awarded by the CCJO to those who have made an outstanding global contribution to human rights. As the head of the Alliance Israélite in France, Cassin had pursued civil rights for the Jews and was an active Zionist.

A high school in Jerusalem is named after him.

In 2003, the Basque government created the René Cassin Award "with the goal of publicly acknowledging and rewarding individuals or collectives that, through their personal or professional path, showed a strong commitment to the promotion, defence and divulgation of Human Rights". The award is given on 10 December, which is International Human Rights Day.

See also
International Institute of Human Rights
List of Jewish Nobel laureates
List of peace activists

References

Works cited

External links

 including the Nobel Lecture, 11 December 1968 The Charter of Human Rights
CCJO.RenéCassin Human Rights Group

1887 births
1976 deaths
Nobel Peace Prize laureates
French Nobel laureates
People from Bayonne
20th-century French Sephardi Jews
Presidents of the European Court of Human Rights
French jurists
Academic staff of the University of Lille Nord de France
Aix-Marseille University alumni
Burials at the Panthéon, Paris
French Ministers of Justice
French military personnel of World War I
Burials at Montparnasse Cemetery
Members of the Permanent Court of Arbitration
French judges of international courts and tribunals
French people of Portuguese-Jewish descent
Members of the Serbian Academy of Sciences and Arts
20th-century jurists
Corresponding Fellows of the British Academy
Foreign members of the Serbian Academy of Sciences and Arts